The 1901 Philadelphia Athletic Club season was the American football team's first season in existence. The team finished with an overall record of 4-2.

Schedule

Game notes

References

Phillies vs. Athletics National Football League, 1902

Philadelphia Phillies (NFL)